Peregrinations is an album by American jazz drummer Chico Hamilton featuring performances recorded in 1975 and originally released on the Blue Note label.

Reception
The Allmusic review by Scott Yanow called it 'an uncomfortable mixture of advanced jazz and commercial elements" stating "The overall effect is a bit weird, dated but with some colorful moments. Definitely a mixed bag".

Track listing
All compositions by Chico Hamilton except as indicated
 "V-O" (Steve Turre) - 3:58
 "The Morning Side of Love" - 5:18
 "Abdullah and Abraham" (Arnie Lawrence) - 4:16
 "Andy's Walk" - 4:15
 "Peregrinations" - 3:16
 "Sweet Dreams" - 5:53
 "Little Lisa" (Turre) - 2:49
 "Space for Stacy" - 3:06
 "On and Off" - 2:56
 "It's About That Time" - 0:57

Personnel
Chico Hamilton - drums, percussion
Arthur Blythe - alto saxophone 
Arnie Lawrence - tenor saxophone, soprano saxophone
Joe Beck, Barry Finnerty - electric guitar 
Steve Turre - electric bass, trombone
Abdullah - congas, bongos, percussion
Jerry Peters - piano, electric piano 
Charlotte Politte - synthesizer programs 
Julia Tillman Waters, Luther Waters, Maxine Willard Waters, Oren Waters - vocals

References 

Blue Note Records albums
Chico Hamilton albums
1975 albums